Mohamed El-Abed (born 5 September 1956) is a Syrian sprinter. He competed in the men's 400 metres at the 1980 Summer Olympics.

References

External links

1956 births
Living people
Athletes (track and field) at the 1980 Summer Olympics
Syrian male sprinters
Olympic athletes of Syria
Place of birth missing (living people)
20th-century Syrian people